Innisfail State College is a government secondary school and technical college in Innisfail Estate, a suburb of Innisfail, Cassowary Coast Region, Queensland, Australia.

It is a combined secondary school and TAFE facility which opened in 2010, replacing Innisfail State High School and the Innisfail TAFE in Innisfail, Queensland. It will use existing TAFE buildings as well as new buildings that have been recently built.

Since 2015, Innisfail State College has split P Block Classrooms for TAFE students. Today, Innisfail State College is a high school for students in Years 7 - 12, Primary and Secondary Education for students with a disability at the Diverse Learning Centre, and a TAFE facility for post-secondary students. The Principal of Innisfail State College is Catherine MacDonald, Principal of Innisfail State College since mid-2012.

References

Public high schools in Queensland
Schools in Far North Queensland
Buildings and structures in Innisfail, Queensland
Educational institutions established in 2010
2010 establishments in Australia